Reptiles are tetrapod animals in the class Reptilia, comprising today's turtles, crocodilians, snakes, amphisbaenians, lizards, tuatara, and their extinct relatives. The study of these traditional reptile orders, historically combined with that of modern amphibians, is called herpetology.

The following list of reptiles lists the vertebrate class of reptiles by family, spanning two subclasses. Reptile here is taken in its traditional (paraphyletic) sense, and thus birds are not included (although birds are considered reptiles in the cladistic sense).

Subclass Anapsida

Order Testudines – turtles
Suborder Cryptodira
Family Chelydridae – common snapping turtles and alligator snapping turtle
Family Emydidae – pond turtles and box turtles
Family Testudinidae – tortoises
Family Geoemydidae – Asian river turtles and allies
Family Carettochelyidae – pignose turtles
Family Trionychidae – softshell turtles
Family Dermatemydidae – river turtles
Family Kinosternidae – mud turtles
Family Cheloniidae – sea turtles
Family Dermochelyidae – leatherback turtles
Suborder Pleurodira
Family Chelidae – Austro-American sideneck turtles
Family Pelomedusidae – Afro-American sideneck turtles
Family Podocnemididae – Madagascan big-headed turtles and American sideneck river turtles

Subclass Diapsida

Superorder Lepidosauria

Order Sphenodontia – tuatara
Family Sphenodontidae

Order Squamata – scaled reptiles
Family Agamidae – agamas
Family Chamaeleonidae – chameleons
Family Iguanidae
Subfamily Corytophaninae – casquehead lizard
Subfamily Iguaninae – iguanas
Subfamily Leiocephalinae
Subfamily Leiosaurinae
Subfamily Liolaeminae
Subfamily Oplurinae – Madagascar iguanids
Family Crotaphytidae – collared and leopard lizards
Family Phrynosomatidae – horned lizards
Family Polychrotidae – anoles
Family Hoplocercidae – wood lizards
Family Tropiduridae – Neotropical ground lizards
Family Gekkonidae – geckos
Family Pygopodidae – legless lizards
Family Dibamidae – blind lizards 
Family Cordylidae – spinytail lizards
Family Gerrhosauridae – plated lizards
Family Gymnophthalmidae – spectacled lizards
Family Teiidae – whiptails and tegus
Family Lacertidae – lacertids
Family Scincidae – skinks
Family Xantusiidae – night lizards
Family Anguidae – glass lizards
Family Anniellidae – American legless lizards
Family Xenosauridae – knob-scaled lizards
Family Helodermatidae – Gila monsters
Family Lanthanotidae – earless monitor lizards
Family Varanidae – monitor lizards
Suborder Amphisbaenia
Family Amphisbaenidae – worm lizards
Family Trogonophidae – shorthead worm lizards
Family Bipedidae – two-legged worm lizards

Suborder Serpentes – snakes
Infraorder Alethinophidia
Family Acrochordidae – wart snakes
Family Aniliidae – false coral snakes
Family Anomochilidae – dwarf pipe snakes
Family Atractaspididae – African burrowing asps, stiletto snakes
Family Boidae – Gray, 1825 – boas, anacondas
Subfamily Boinae
Subfamily Erycinae – Old World sand boas
Family Bolyeriidae – Mauritius snakes
Family Colubridae – Colubrids, typical snakes
Subfamily Xenodermatinae
Subfamily Homalopsinae
Subfamily Boodontinae
Subfamily Pseudoxyrhophiinae
Subfamily Colubrinae
Subfamily Psammophiinae
Subfamily Natricinae
Subfamily Pseudoxenodontinae
Subfamily Dipsadinae
Subfamily Xenodontinae
Family Cylindrophiidae – Asian pipe snakes
Family Elapidae – cobras, coral snakes, mambas, sea snakes
Family Loxocemidae – Mexican pythons
Family Pythonidae – pythons
Family Tropidophiidae – dwarf boas
Family Uropeltidae – pipe snakes, shield-tailed snakes
Family Viperidae – vipers, pitvipers
Subfamily Azemiopinae – Fae's viper
Subfamily Causinae – night adders
Subfamily Crotalinae – pitvipers, rattlesnakes
Subfamily Viperinae – true vipers
Family Xenopeltidae – sunbeam snakes
Infraorder Scolecophidia – blind snakes
Family Anomalepididae – primitive blind snakes
Family Leptotyphlopidae – slender blind snakes, thread snakes
Family Typhlopidae – blind snakes, typical blind snakes

Division Archosauria
Superorder Crocodylomorpha

Order Crocodylia – crocodilians

Suborder Eusuchia
Family Crocodylidae – crocodiles
Family Alligatoridae – alligators
Family Gavialidae – gharials

See also
 Reptile
 List of regional reptiles lists
 List of birds
 List of snakes
 Herping

External links
 Reptile Database

 
Reptiles

de:Systematik der Reptilien